Perlak is a town in Aceh, Indonesia.

References

Populated places in Aceh